Wade House Historical Site, also called Old Wade House, is a  open-air museum in Greenbush, Wisconsin. A Wisconsin historic site, the site is operated by the Wisconsin Historical Society.

The site contains nine major structures, three of which are listed in the National Register of Historic Places.

The namesake structure is the Sylvanus Wade House constructed in 1848–1849.

Live historic interpreters wearing period-style clothing populate the park during summer operations.

History
The Wade house was restored in 1950–1953 by the Kohler Foundation and then turned over to the state to be operated as a state park.

The Wesley W. Jung Carriage Museum was constructed and opened to the public in 1968. The museum features a collection of horse-drawn and hand-drawn vehicles, including carriages, sleighs, wagons, fire wagons and more.

The Robinson-Herrling sawmill site and 97 acres of property were purchased in 1960. was reconstructed on its original site from 1999 to 2001.

A new  visitor center and carriage museum was opened in 2013.

List of structures

Three of the site's structures are listed on the National Register of Historic Places.

See also
National Register of Historic Places listings in Sheboygan County, Wisconsin

References

External links

 

1953 establishments in Wisconsin
Museums in Sheboygan County, Wisconsin
Open-air museums in Wisconsin
Wisconsin Historical Society
History museums in Wisconsin
National Register of Historic Places in Wisconsin
Protected areas established in 1953
Protected areas of Sheboygan County, Wisconsin
National Register of Historic Places in Sheboygan County, Wisconsin